"Size Matters (Someday)" is a song written by Byron Hill and Mike Dekle and recorded by American country music artist Joe Nichols. It was released in January 2006 as the second single from Nichols' album III. The song peaked at number 9 on the U.S. Billboard Hot Country Songs chart. The song also won an ASCAP Award in 2007 for being among the most performed country songs of 2006.

Content
The song depicts a woman who, despite having ambitious material goals for the future, only wants a man to love her for right now. Hence, the only thing whose size matters to her is his heart.

Music video
The music video was directed by Warren P. Sonada and premiered in early 2006.

Chart positions
"Size Matters (Someday)" debuted at number 55 on the U.S. Billboard Hot Country Songs for the week of January 28, 2006.

Year-end charts

References

2006 singles
Joe Nichols songs
Songs written by Byron Hill
Song recordings produced by Buddy Cannon
Show Dog-Universal Music singles
2005 songs